Melquíades Rojas Medrano (born December 10, 1966) is a Dominican former Major League Baseball (MLB) relief pitcher. From 1990 to 1999, he played for the Montreal Expos, Chicago Cubs, New York Mets and Los Angeles Dodgers of the National League and the Detroit Tigers of the American League.

Career
His best season was in 1992, when he posted a 7-1 record in 68 relief appearances. Rojas had an amazing 1.43 ERA in 100.2 innings, and a WHIP of 1.043. He primarily was the set up man for closer John Wetteland (37 saves in 1992), but Rojas was able to accumulate 10 saves that season.

On May 11, 1994, Rojas struck out three batters on nine pitches in the ninth inning of a 4-3 win over the New York Mets.  Rojas became the 19th National League pitcher and the 28th pitcher in major-league history to accomplish an immaculate inning.

Mel Rojas joined Sinon Bulls of Chinese Professional Baseball League in Taiwan in 2004, played 11 games, posted 3 saves with 1.20 ERA and 14 strikeouts in 15 innings, but then was released by the team after the season ended.

Personal life
Mel Rojas is the nephew of Felipe, Jesús, and Matty Alou and the cousin of Moisés Alou.

Mel Rojas' son, Mel Rojas Jr. was selected 84th overall in the 2010 Major League Baseball Draft by the Pittsburgh Pirates. He played for the KT Wiz of the KBO League from 2017 until 2020, winning the league MVP in 2020. He is currently playing for Hanshin Tigers of the NPB.

See also
Alou family

References

External links

1966 births
Living people
Alou family
Bridgeport Bluefish players
Burlington Expos players
Chicago Cubs players
Detroit Tigers players
Dominican Republic expatriate baseball players in Canada
Dominican Republic expatriate baseball players in the United States
Gulf Coast Expos players
Indianapolis Indians players
Jacksonville Expos players

Los Angeles Dodgers players
Major League Baseball players from the Dominican Republic
Major League Baseball pitchers
Montreal Expos players
Nashua Pride players
New York Mets players
Ottawa Lynx players
Pawtucket Red Sox players
Rockford Expos players
Sarasota Red Sox players
West Palm Beach Expos players
People from Bajos de Haina